Greg Glazner (b. Anson, Texas 1958) is an American poet.

Life
He graduated from Hardin-Simmons University, and the University of Montana, with an M.A. and M.F.A.

His work has appeared in Poetry, Ironwood, The Laurel Review, New England Journal, Pequod, Quarterly West, The Southern Poetry Review, and The Texas Review.  He works on music/poetry projects with bands including Zeno's Run.

He was the Richard Hugo Visiting Writer at the University of Montana in  2002.  He taught at the College of Santa Fe which is now closed.

He currently teaches at UC Davis.

Awards
 1991 Walt Whitman Award chosen by Charles Wright
 Bess Hokin Award from Poetry
 Lannan Foundation residency in Marfa 
 2005 NEA Fellowship

Works
 Cellar Testament. William Paterson University Press. 2019 chapbook ISBN 9781727314335
 "Zeno's Cure Chapter 1"
 
 
  chapbook

Ploughshares

References

External links
 Audio: Greg Glazner reads "A Fine, Clean Gloss" from Singularity (1996, W. W, Norton)

Year of birth missing (living people)
Living people
20th-century American poets
People from Anson, Texas
Hardin–Simmons University alumni
University of Montana alumni
Poets from Texas